Nijō Street (二条通 にじょうどおり Nijō dōri) is a major street that crosses the center of the city of Kyoto from east to west, running for approximately 3.5 km from Shirakawa Street (east) to the Nijō Castle (west).

History 
Current day Nijō Street corresponds to the Nijō Ōji of the Heian-kyō, which according to records had a total wide of 51 meters (actual road section 43.8 meters wide), being the second widest road of the time, after the Suzaku Avenue.

During the Edo period it was a drugstore district with the approval of the Tokugawa shogunate and to this day some of these businesses still remain in the area.

From 1895 to 1926, a tram operated by the former Kyoto Electric Railway ran on the street, between Teramachi Street and Jingū Michi Street.

Present Day 
Nowadays the section west of Teramachi Street becomes a narrow one-way road. An important number of cultural, art and education related institutions are located in the vicinity of the street as well.

Relevant Landmarks Along the Street 

 Kyoto City Zoo
 National Museum of Modern Art, Kyoto
 Kyoto Municipal Museum of Art
 Kyoto Prefectural Library
 ROHM Theatre Kyoto
 Miyako Messe
 The Ritz-Carlton Kyoto
 Bank of Japan Kyoto Branch
 Shimadzu Foundation Memorial Hall
 HOTEL THE MITSUI KYOTO
 Nijō Castle

External links 

 Kyoto City Zoo
 National Museum of Modern Art, Kyoto
 Kyoto Municipal Museum of Art
 Kyoto Prefectural Library
 ROHM Theatre Kyoto
 Miyako Messe
 The Ritz-Carlton Kyoto
 Bank of Japan Kyoto Branch
 Shimadzu Foundation Memorial Hall
 HOTEL THE MITSUI KYOTO
 Nijō Castle

References 

Streets in Kyoto